Sidney Harman Hall is a theater at Sixth and F Streets NW in Washington, D.C. It is part of the Harman Center for the Arts, along with the Lansburgh Theatre. It is the home of the Shakespeare Theatre Company (STC).

Built for $89 million, the building was designed by Paul Beckmann of the DC firm Smithgroup; the theater itself by Toronto architect Jack Diamond. It opened on October 1, 2007.

The Harman seats 775, an increase over the Lansburgh’s 451. The stage  accommodates multiple staging configurations, allowing it to be rented by various arts groups. The walls of the theater are panels of makore, an African wood; velour curtains behind the panels can be raised to alter the room's acoustics. The first several rows of seats are on movable wagons that can be either set parallel to the stage or rotated to form a thrust stage.

The theatre is named for Dr. Sidney Harman, a philanthropist and STC trustee.

From October 25-28, 2010, Sidney Harman Hall hosted The Daily Show with Jon Stewart, including the October 27 show whose guest  was President Barack Obama.

See also

Theater in Washington D.C.

References

External links
Shakespeare Theatre Company Official Website

Penn Quarter
Theatres in Washington, D.C.